A bagger is a supermarket clerk who puts purchases into a bag.

Bagger may also refer to:
 Bagger, a touring motorcycle equipped with saddlebag
 Bagger Wood, a woodland in South Yorkshire, England
 Bagger (surname), a list of people
 The title character of the 2000 film The Legend of Bagger Vance

See also
 Bagger 288 and Bagger 293, bucket-wheel excavators